Four Adventures of Reinette and Mirabelle is a 1987 French film directed by Éric Rohmer, starring Joëlle Miquel, Jessica Forde, Fabrice Luchini and Philippe Laudenbach.

Synopsis
The film consists of four episodes in the relationship of two young women: Reinette, a country girl, and Mirabelle, a Parisian. The first episode, L'Heure Bleue/The Blue Hour, recounts their meeting, and Reinette's wish to share the Blue Hour, a moment of silence between the natural sounds of the night and the dawn. The second episode, Le Garcon de Cafe/The Waiter, centers on a café and a difficult waiter. In the third, Le Mendiant, La Kleptomane, et L'Arnaqueuse/The Beggar, the Kleptomaniac and the Hustler, the girls discuss their differing views on people at the margins of society: beggars, thieves and swindlers. In the fourth episode, La Vente du Tableau/Selling the Painting, Reinette and Mirabelle succeed in selling one of Reinette's paintings to an art dealer, while Reinette pretends to be mute and Mirabelle, acting as if she does not know Reinette, does all the talking.

References

External links
 
 

1987 films
Films directed by Éric Rohmer
Films about fictional painters
French female buddy films
1980s female buddy films
1980s French-language films
1980s French films